Sir Samuel Crompton, 1st Baronet (8 July 1785 – 27 December 1848) was a politician in the United Kingdom. He served as a Member for Parliament for East Retford, Derby and Thirsk. He also served as Deputy Lieutenant for the North Riding of Yorkshire.

Early life

Crompton was the son and heir in 1810 of Samuel Crompton, a Derby banker, and Sarah ( Fox) Crompton. His father had been the mayor of Derby in 1782 and 1788. His mother was the daughter of Samuel Fox of Derby. The Crompton family was said to be descended from a Reverend John Crompton who settled in Derbyshire at the time of Charles I. Genealogies of the period refer to the family as the Cromptons of Milford House.

He was educated at the Charterhouse School in 1798 before attending Trinity College, Cambridge in 1804.

Career
Crompton sat as a Member of Parliament for East Retford in 1818 and served as that member of parliament until 1826, when he was elected for Derby. He held that seat until 1830. In 1834 he was elected for Thirsk. He supported the premiership of Lord Melbourne but he was not a radical liberal. Such Liberal measures as shortening parliaments or adopting voting by ballot did not enjoy his support. Crompton was created a baronet, of Wood End, Yorkshire, on 21 July 1838. He retired as member for Thirsk in 1841 when he returned to his residence there called Wood End.

Crompton served as Deputy Lieutenant for the North Riding of Yorkshire from 1808.

Personal life
On 3 November 1829, Crompton married Isabella Sophia Hamilton, sixth daughter of the former Frances Henrietta Fremantle and the Hon. Rev. Archibald Hamilton Cathcart (a son of the 9th Lord Cathcart) and niece to the 1st Earl Cathcart. He was survived by his wife and his four daughters, of whom Isabel Sarah Crompton (b. 1833), Fanny Selina Crompton (b. 1835), and Alice Crompton (b. 1837) died young. His only surviving daughter was:

 Elizabeth Mary Crompton (1831–1902), who married Alan Cathcart, 3rd Earl Cathcart, eldest surviving son of Charles Cathcart, 2nd Earl Cathcart, in 1850.

Sir Samuel died on 27 December 1848, aged 63, at the family home. As he died without sons, the baronetcy became extinct.

References

External links 
 

1786 births
1849 deaths
Baronets in the Baronetage of the United Kingdom
Deputy Lieutenants of the North Riding of Yorkshire
Members of the Parliament of the United Kingdom for English constituencies
UK MPs 1826–1830
UK MPs 1832–1835
UK MPs 1835–1837
UK MPs 1837–1841
UK MPs 1818–1820
UK MPs 1820–1826